Events from the year 1947 in Sweden

Incumbents
 Monarch – Gustaf V
 Prime Minister – Tage Erlander

Events

On January 26, Prince Gustaf Adolf, Duke of Vasterbotten (second-in-line to the throne) was killed in a plane crash in Copenhagen, Denmark.
 Karin Kock-Lindberg becomes the first female government minister.

Births

 19 February – Ingvar Hansson, sailor.
 17 March – Hans Jacobson, fencer, Olympic champion from 1976 (died 1984).
 26 July – Gunnar Lund, diplomat and politician.
 5 September – Tommy Limby, cross-country skier (died 2008).
 30 October – Sven Melander, journalist and television presenter.(died 2022)

Deaths
 26 January – Gustaf Adolf, prince of Sweden (born 1906)
 14 February – Mauritz Eriksson, sport shooter, Olympic champion from 1912 (born 1888).
 10 August –  Elisabet Anrep-Nordin, pedagogue (born 1857)
 6 December – Henric Horn af Åminne, horse rider (born 1880)

References

 
Sweden
Years of the 20th century in Sweden